Cymosafia is a genus of moths of the family Noctuidae. The genus was erected by George Hampson in 1913.

Species
Cymosafia andraei Köhler, 1979 Bolivia
Cymosafia dolorosa Köhler, 1979 Bolivia
Cymosafia laba H. Druce, 1890
Cymosafia pallida Hampson, 1913
Cymosafia pumilia Köhler, 1979 Bolivia

References

Catocalinae